It's Only Rock & Roll is an album by Waylon Jennings, released on RCA Victor in 1983.

Recording
Jennings, who had been a mainstay on at the top of the country charts for most of the previous decade, began a commercial slide with It's Only Rock & Roll. The LP, which Jennings produced with Randy Scruggs, did produce a number 1 hit: a cover of Little Richard's rock and roll classic "Lucille (You Won't Do Your Daddy's Will)," his twelfth number 1 since 1974. Jennings would not top the singles chart again until 1987. The single "Breakin' Down" also made the Top 10. Jennings contributed two songs for the LP: "Let Her Do the Walking," which he wrote himself, and the reflective "No Middle Ground," which he composed with Gary Scruggs. Songwriter Rodney Crowell, who had written Jennings' number 1 song "I Ain't Living Long Like This" and had become one of the singer's favorite writers, has two songwriting credits, including the title track and the ballad "Angel Eyes". Jennings' wife Jessi Colter, Marcia Beverly, and Jerry Gropp provide harmony vocals on the LP.

Understandably, considering his condition at the time, Jennings was not fond of his work during this period: "I was doing bad records.  Missing shows due to laryngitis.  Not picking up the guitar unless I was getting paid.  Not caring."

Reception

It's Only Rock & Roll peaked at number 10 on the Billboard country albums chart, Jennings' worst showing since Honky Tonk Heroes in 1973.

Crispin Sartwell of Record was dismissive of the album's closing medley, saying that all of its material had been done far better on other albums, but asserted that every other track on It's Only Rock & Roll is "old-fashioned, kick-butt country and rock." He especially praised Jennings's rendition of "Lucille" for its simplicity and straightforwardness.

Jim Worbois of AllMusic's brief retrospective review read: "While many labels were raiding their vaults to create "medley" records of artists no longer signed with them ... Jennings seems to have done it to himself. There are a couple nice songs on here, but it's not one of his best."

Track listing
"It's Only Rock & Roll" (Rodney Crowell)
"Living Legends" (Waylon Jennings)
"Breakin' Down" (Joe Rainey)
"Let Her Do the Walking" (Jennings)
"Mental Revenge" (Mel Tillis)
"Lucille (You Won't Do Your Daddy's Will)" (Albert Collins, Little Richard)
"Angel Eyes" (Crowell)
"No Middle Ground" (Jennings, Gary Scruggs)
"Love's Legalities" (Michael Smotherman)
Medley:
"I'm a Ramblin' Man" (Ray Pennington)
"This Time" (Jennings)
"Don't You Think This Outlaw Bit's Done Got Out of Hand" (Jennings)
"Clyde" (J. J. Cale)
"Good Hearted Woman" (Jennings, Willie Nelson)
"Ladies Love Outlaws" (Lee Clayton)
"Luckenbach, Texas (Back to the Basics of Love)" (Chips Moman, Bobby Emmons)
"I've Always Been Crazy" (Jennings)

Chart performance

References

Waylon Jennings albums
1983 albums
RCA Records albums